Christine Petit (born 4 February 1948) is a French geneticist. She holds professorships at the Collège de France and the Pasteur Institute.

Biography
Petit was born in Laignes in 1948. She initially studied at the Paris teaching hospital, Pitié-Salpêtrière Hospital and at the Pasteur Institute. She completed two pieces of post-doctoral research at the Centre for Molecular Research in Gif-sur-Yvette and another in Basel.

Petit holds professorships at Collège de France and the Pasteur Institute. She has a member of the Academy of Science since 14 January 2002.

Petit's research has explored the link between genes and deafness, with her research group at INSERM "Génétique et physiologie de l’audition". She is one of the pioneers of auditory genetics.

Together with Karen Steel, Petit won the Royal Society Brain Prize 2012, for their pioneering work on the genetics of hearing and deafness.

Prizes and honours
1999 : Prix Charles-Leopold Mayer of the Academy of Sciences
2004 : L'Oréal-UNESCO For Women in Science
2006 : Louis-Jeantet Prize for Medicine
2007 : Grand Prix of Medical Research INSERM
2012 : Co-recipient with Karen Steel of the Royal Society's Brain Prize
2016 : Foreign associate of the National Academy of Sciences
Knight of the Legion of Honour
Officer of the National Order of Merit
2018 : Kavli Prize in Neuroscience (shared with James Hudspeth and Robert Fettiplace)
2020 : Louisa Gross Horwitz Prize (shared with James Hudspeth and Robert Fettiplace).
2021 : Gruber Prize in Neuroscience (shared with Christopher A. Walsh).

References

1948 births
Living people
People from Côte-d'Or
French geneticists
Academic staff of the Collège de France
Members of the French Academy of Sciences
Foreign associates of the National Academy of Sciences
Officers of the Ordre national du Mérite
Pasteur Institute
L'Oréal-UNESCO Awards for Women in Science laureates
21st-century American women scientists
Kavli Prize laureates in Neuroscience